Mélusine or Melusina is a figure of European folklore, a female spirit of fresh water in a holy well or river. She is usually depicted as a woman who is a serpent or fish from the waist down (much like a lamia or a mermaid). She is also sometimes illustrated with wings, two tails, or both. Her legends are especially connected with the northern and western areas of France, Luxembourg, and the Low Countries. 

The Limburg-Luxemburg dynasty (which ruled the Holy Roman Empire from 1308 to 1437 as well as Bohemia and Hungary), the House of Anjou and their descendants the House of Plantagenet (kings of England), and the French House of Lusignan (kings of Cyprus from 1205–1472, and for shorter periods over Cilician Armenia and Jerusalem) are said in folk tales and medieval literature to be descended from Melusine. The story combines several major legendary themes, such as the water nymph or mermaid, the earth being (terroir), the genius loci or guardian spirit of a location, the succubus who comes from the diabolical world to unite carnally with a man, or the banshee or harbinger of death.

Etymology
The French Dictionnaire de la langue française suggests the Latin melus, meaning "melodious, pleasant". Another theory is that Melusine was inspired by a Poitevin legend of "Mère Lusine," leader of a band of fairies who built Roman edifices throughout the countryside. Melusine's name varies depending on the areas, such as Merlusse in Vosges or Merluisaine in Champagne.

Literary versions

The most famous literary version of Melusine tales, that of Jean d'Arras, compiled about 1382–1394, was worked into a collection of "spinning yarns" as told by ladies at their spinning coudrette (coulrette (in French)). He wrote The Romans of Partenay or of Lusignen: Otherwise known as the Tale of Melusine, giving source and historical notes, dates and background of the story. He goes into detail and depth about the relationship of Melusine and Raymondin, their initial meeting, and the complete story.

The tale was translated into German in 1456 by Thüring von Ringoltingen, which version became popular as a chapbook. It was later translated into English, twice, around 1500, and often printed in both the 15th century and the 16th century. There is also a Castilian and a Dutch translation, both of which were printed at the end of the 15th century. A prose version is entitled the Chronique de la princesse (Chronicle of the Princess).

The story tells how in the time of the Crusades, Elynas, the King of Albany (an old name for Scotland or Alba), went hunting one day and came across a beautiful lady in the forest. She was Pressyne, mother of Melusine. He persuaded her to marry him but she agreed, only on the promise—for there is often a hard and fatal condition attached to any pairing of fay and mortal—that he must not enter her chamber when she birthed or bathed her children. She gave birth to triplets. When he violated this taboo, Pressyne left the kingdom, together with her three daughters, and traveled to the lost Isle of Avalon.

The three girls—Melusine, Melior, and Palatyne—grew up in Avalon. On their fifteenth birthday, Melusine, the eldest, asked why they had been taken to Avalon. Upon hearing of their father's broken promise, Melusine sought revenge. She and her sisters captured Elynas and locked him, with his riches, in a mountain. Pressyne became enraged when she learned what the girls had done, and punished them for their disrespect to their father. Melusine was condemned to take the form of a serpent from the waist down every Saturday.

Raymond or Raymondin of Poitou came across Melusine in a forest of Coulombiers in Poitou in France, and proposed marriage. Just as her mother had done, she laid a condition: that he must never enter her chamber on a Saturday. For many years Raymond kept his promise, and Melusine bore him ten sons and organized the construction of marvelous castles. However, Raymond was eventually goaded by a relative and grew suspicious of Melusine's activities on Saturday. He broke his promise and peeked into her chamber, where he saw Melusine bathing in half-serpent form. He kept his transgression a secret, until one of their now-adult sons murdered another. In front of his court, the grieving Raymond blamed Melusine and called her a "serpent." She then assumed the form of a dragon, provided him with two magic rings, and flew off, never to be seen again. She returned only at night to nurse her two youngest children, who were still infants.

Analysis 
In folkloristics, German folklorist Hans-Jörg Uther classifies the Melusine tale and related legends as its own tale type of the Aarne-Thompson-Uther Index. In the German Folktale Catalogue (German: Deutscher Märchenkatalog), they are grouped under type *425O, "Melusine", part of a section related to tales where a human maiden marries a supernatural husband in animal form (Animal as Bridegroom).

As in tales of swan maidens, shapeshifting and flight on wings away from oath-breaking husbands figure in stories about Mélusine. According to Sabine Baring-Gould in Curious Tales of the Middle Ages, the pattern of the tale is similar to the Knight of the Swan legend which inspired the character "Lohengrin" in Wolfram von Eschenbach's Parzival.

Jacques Le Goff considered that Melusina represented a fertility figure: "she brings prosperity in a rural area...Melusina is the fairy of medieval economic growth".

Other versions

In France 

Melusine legends are especially connected with the northern areas of France, Poitou and the Low Countries, as well as Cyprus, where the French Lusignan royal house that ruled the island from 1192 to 1489 claimed to be descended from Melusine. Oblique reference to this was made by Sir Walter Scott who told a Melusine tale in Minstrelsy of the Scottish Border (1802–1803) stating that "the reader will find the fairy of Normandy, or Bretagne, adorned with all the splendour of Eastern description". The fairy Melusina, also, who married Guy de Lusignan, Count of Poitou, under condition that he should never attempt to intrude upon her privacy, was of this latter class. She bore the count many children, and erected for him a magnificent castle by her magical art. Their harmony was uninterrupted until the prying husband broke the conditions of their union, by concealing himself to behold his wife make use of her enchanted bath. Hardly had Melusina discovered the indiscreet intruder, than, transforming herself into a dragon, she departed with a loud yell of lamentation, and was never again visible to mortal eyes; although, even in the days of Brantome, she was supposed to be the protectress of her descendants, and was heard wailing as she sailed upon the blast round the turrets of the castle of Lusignan the night before it was demolished.

In Luxembourg 

The Counts of Luxembourg also claimed descent from Melusine through their ancestor Siegfried. When in 963 A.D. Count Siegfried of the Ardennes (Sigefroi in French; Sigfrid in Luxembourgish) bought the feudal rights to the territory on which he founded his capital city of Luxembourg, his name became connected with the local version of Melusine. This Melusina had essentially the same magic gifts as the ancestress of the Lusignans. The morning after their wedding, she magically created the Castle of Luxembourg on the Bock rock (the historical center point of Luxembourg City). On her terms of marriage, she too required one day of absolute privacy each week. Eventually Sigfrid was tempted by curiosity and entered her apartment on Saturday, when he saw her in her bath and discovered her to be a mermaid. He cried out in surprise, and Melusina and her bath sank into the earth. Melusine remained trapped in the rock but returns every seven years either as a woman or a serpent, carrying a golden key in her mouth. Anyone brave enough to take the key will free her and win her as his bride. Also every seven years, Melusine adds a stitch to a linen chemise; if she finishes the chemise before she can be freed, all of Luxembourg will be swallowed by the rock. In 1997, Luxembourg issued a postage stamp commemorating her.

In Germany 

In his Table Talks, Martin Luther mentioned Melusina of Lucelberg (Luxembourg), whom he described as a succubus or the devil. Luther believed in stories like Melusine and attributed them to the devil appearing in female form to seduce men.  

The story of Melusine strongly influenced Paracelsus's writings on elementals and especially his description of water spirits. This, in turn, inspired Friedrich de la Motte Fouqué's novella Undine (1811), which led to adaptations and references in works such as Jean Giraudoux's play Ondine (1939), Hans Christian Andersen's fairy tale The Little Mermaid (1837), and Antonín Dvořák's opera Rusalka (1901). 

In a legend set in the forest of Stollenwald, a young man meets a beautiful woman named Melusina who has the lower body of a snake. If he will kiss her three times on three consecutive days, she will be freed. However, on each day she becomes more and more monstrous, until the young man flees in terror without giving her the final kisses. He later marries another girl, but the food at their wedding feast is mysteriously poisoned with serpent venom and everyone who eats it dies.

Other Germanic water sprites include Lorelei and the nixie.

In Britain 

Melusine is one of the pre-Christian water-faeries  who were sometimes responsible for changelings. The "Lady of the Lake", who spirited away the infant Lancelot and raised the child, was such a water nymph. 

A folktale tradition of a demon wife similar to Melusine appears in early English literature. According to the chronicler Gerald of Wales, Richard I of England was fond of telling a tale that he was a descendant of an unnamed countess of Anjou. In the legend, an early Count of Anjou encountered a beautiful woman from a foreign land. They were married and had four sons. However, the count became troubled because his wife only attended church infrequently, and always left in the middle of Mass. One day he had four of his men forcibly restrain his wife as she rose to leave the church. She evaded the men and, in full view of the congregation, flew out of the church through its highest window. She carried her two youngest sons away with her. One of the remaining sons was the ancestor of the later Counts of Anjou, their troublesome nature being the result of their demonic background. 

A similar story became attached to Eleanor of Aquitaine, as seen in the 14th-century romance Richard Coer de Lyon. In this fantastical account, Henry II's wife is not named Eleanor but Cassodorien, and she always leaves Mass before the elevation of the Host. They have three children: Richard, John, and a daughter named Topyas. When Henry forces Cassodorien to stay in Mass, she flies through the roof of the church carrying her daughter, never to be seen again.

Related legends

The Travels of Sir John Mandeville recounts a legend about Hippocrates' daughter. She was transformed into a hundred-foot long dragon by the goddess Diane, and is the "lady of the manor" of an old castle. She emerges three times a year, and will be turned back into a woman if a knight kisses her, making the knight into her consort and ruler of the islands. Various knights try, but flee when they see the hideous dragon; they die soon thereafter. This appears to be an early version of the legend of Melusine.

The motif of the cursed serpent-maiden freed by a kiss also appears in the story of Le Bel Inconnu.

References in the arts and popular culture

Arts

 Melusine is the subject of Halévy's grand opera La magicienne (1858), although the story is greatly altered. Rather than a half-fairy under a curse, Melusine is a witch who has sold her soul to the Devil and is beautiful by day and hideous by night.
 Johann Wolfgang von Goethe reinterpreted the legend in his short story Die Neue Melusine ("The New Melusine") and published it as part of Wilhelm Meisters Wanderjahre (1807). In this version, Melusine is a tiny elf who sometimes takes on human size.
 The playwright Franz Grillparzer brought Goethe's tale to the stage and Felix Mendelssohn provided a concert overture The Fair Melusine (Zum Märchen von der Schönen Melusine), opus 32.
 Marcel Proust's main character compares Gilberte to Melusine in Within a Budding Grove. She is also compared on several occasions to the Duchesse de Guermantes who was (according to the Duc de Guermantes) directly descended from the Lusignan dynasty. In the Guermantes Way, for example, the narrator observes that the Lusignan family "was fated to become extinct on the day when the fairy Melusine should disappear".
 The story of Melusine (also called Melusina) was retold by Letitia Landon in the poem "The Fairy of the Fountains" in Fisher's Drawing Room Scrap Book and reprinted in her collection The Zenana. Here she is representative of the female poet.
 In Our Lady of the Flowers, Jean Genet twice says that Divine, the main character, is descended from "the siren Melusina".
 Dorothy L. Sayers's short story The leopard lady in the 1939 collection In the teeth of the evidence features a Miss Smith "who should have been called Melusine".
 Melusine appears to have inspired aspects of the character Mélisande, who is associated with springs and waters, in Maurice Maeterlinck's play Pelléas and Mélisande, first produced in 1893. Claude Debussy adapted it as an opera by the same name, produced in 1902.
 Margaret Irwin's fantasy novel These Mortals (1925) revolves around Melusine leaving her father's palace, and having adventures in the world of humans.
 In Andrè Breton's 1928 novel Nadja, the eponymous character evokes the character of Melusina while discussing dreams and her painting outside the Palais-Royal with the author.
 Charlotte Haldane wrote a study of Melusine in 1936 (which her then husband J.B.S. Haldane referred to in his children's book "My Friend Mr Leakey").
 Aribert Reimann composed an opera Melusine, which premiered in 1971.
 The Melusine legend is featured in A. S. Byatt's late 20th century novel Possession. One of the main characters, Christabel LaMotte, writes an epic poem about Melusina.
 Philip the Good's 1454 Feast of the Pheasant featured as one of the lavish 'entremets' (or table decorations) a mechanical depiction of Melusine as a dragon flying around the castle of Lusignan.
 Rosemary Hawley Jarman used a reference from Sabine Baring-Gould's Curious Myths of the Middle Ages that the House of Luxembourg claimed descent from Melusine in her 1972 novel The King's Grey Mare, making Elizabeth Woodville's family claim descent from the water-spirit. This element is repeated in Philippa Gregory's novels The White Queen (2009) and The Lady of the Rivers (2011), but with Jacquetta of Luxembourg telling Elizabeth that their descent from Melusine comes through the Dukes of Burgundy.
 In The Wandering Unicorn (1965) by Manuel Mujica Láinez, Melusine tells her tale of several centuries of existence, from her original curse to the time of the Crusades.
 In his 2016 novel In Search of Sixpence the writer Michael Paraskos retells the story of Melusine by imagining her as a Turkish Cypriot girl forceably abducted from the island by a visiting Frenchman.
 In the 2021 novel Matrix by Lauren Groff, the poet Marie de France is said to be descended from the fairy Melusine.

Video games 
 In Monster Musume, a subspecies of lamia that has a pair of bat wings is named after her.
 In Fire Emblem Engage, the exclusive class of the villainous character Zephia is named after the melusine. 
 Melusine appears as a Lancer-Class servant in the mobile game Fate/Grand Order.

Other references 
 In Czech and Slovak, the word meluzína refers to wailing wind, usually in the chimney. This is a reference to the wailing Melusine looking for her children.
In June 2019, it was announced that Luxembourg's first petascale supercomputer, a part of the European High-Performance Computing Joint Undertaking (EuroHPC JU) programme, is to be named "Meluxina".
 The Starbucks logo is based on the melusine of heraldry, depicted as a siren or mermaid with a crown and two tails.
 In 2022, the French postal system released a 1.65 euro stamp depicting la fee melusine as part of a series of myths and legends.

See also
Echidna (mythology), Greek Mythological serpent woman, mother of monsters
Shahmaran, Benevolent serpent-woman from Anatolian and Iranian mythology
Legend of the White Snake
Morgen (mythological creature)
Neck (water spirit)
Naiad
Potamides (mythology)
Partonopeus de Blois
Yuki-onna
Knight of the Swan

Literature 
  Essays on the Roman de Mélusine (1393) of Jean d'Arras.
  On the many translations of the romance, covering French, German, Dutch, Castilian, and English versions.
  A scholarly edition of the important medieval French version of the legend by Jean d'Arras.

 
 Letitia Elizabeth Landon, Fisher's Drawing Room Scrap Book, 1835 (1834).

References

External links

"Melusina", translated legends about mermaids and water sprites that marry mortal men, with sources noted, edited by D. L. Ashliman, at University of Pittsburgh

Jean D'Arras, Melusine, Archive.org

European legendary creatures
Fictional Scottish people
Medieval legends
French legendary creatures
European dragons
Mythological human hybrids
Water spirits
Mermaids